Perserikatan Sepakbola Indonesia Kabupaten Bandung Barat or Persikabbar (English: Indonesian Football Union of West Bandung Regency) is an Indonesian football club based in West Bandung Regency, West Java. They currently compete in the Liga 3.

Honours
 Liga 3 West Java Series 2
 Third-place: 2021

References

External links
 

West Bandung Regency
Football clubs in Indonesia
Football clubs in West Java
Association football clubs established in 2019
2019 establishments in Indonesia